is a railway station in the city of Chiryū, Aichi, Japan, operated by Meitetsu.

Lines
Chiryū Station is served by both the Mikawa Line and Nagoya Main Lines. It is 41.3 kilometers from the terminus of the Nagoya Line at Toyohashi Station and is a terminus of the 39.8 kilometer Mikawa Line.

Station layout
The station has four island platforms connected by footbridges. The station is staffed.

Platforms

Adjacent stations

History
The Aichi Electric Railway Company was taken over by Meitetsu on August 1, 1935, becoming the Meitetsu Nagoya Main Line, and the Mikawa Railway on June 1, 1941. Shin Chryū Station merged with the Chiryū Station (Main Line Side).

Future plans
Construction of a new elevated station has been in progress since 2015. The tracks for each of the lines will gradually be moved to the new station structure. When completed, the station will compose of three levels with the platforms on the Nagoya Main Line on the 2nd level and the platforms for the Mikawa Line on the top level.

The first tracks that will be moved to the new facilities will be the southbound tracks (currently serving platform 6), which will be reassigned to platform 8 on the new elevated platform. As of December 2022, the move is scheduled to take place on 21 March 2023.

Passenger statistics
In fiscal 2017, the station was used by an average of 33,102 passengers daily (boarding passengers only).

Surrounding area
 Chiryū Elementary School
 Chiryū Jinja
Japan National Route 1

See also
 List of Railway Stations in Japan

References

External links

 Official home page 
 Elevated Station press release update (13 December 2022) 

Railway stations in Japan opened in 1959
Railway stations in Aichi Prefecture
Stations of Nagoya Railroad
Chiryū, Aichi